On 4 April 2011, Georgian Airways Flight 834, a Bombardier CRJ100 passenger jet of Georgian Airways operating a domestic flight from Kisangani to Kinshasa in Democratic Republic of Congo (DRC) crashed while attempting to land at Kinshasa Airport. The aircraft, which was chartered by the United Nations, was trying to land during a thunderstorm. Of the 33 people on board, only one person survived. It remains as United Nations' deadliest aviation disaster. It is also the third deadliest air disaster involving the CRJ100/200, behind Comair Flight 5191 and China Eastern Airlines Flight 5210. 

The government of the DRC set up an investigation commission to probe the crash. It concluded that the aircraft had encountered a microburst moments after initiating a go-around, causing it to rapidly lose its altitude. Even though the crew's weather radar had depicted severe weather activity around the airport, the crew didn't discontinue their flight to Kinshasa. Following the rapid altitude loss, the crew failed to recover the aircraft due to their very low altitude.

Aircraft
The aircraft was a Bombardier CRJ100ER, registered 4L-GAE with a manufacturer serial number of c/n 7070. The aircraft was delivered in 1995 to French airline Brit Air, as F-GRJA. It was sold to Georgian Airways in September 2007. On 13 May 2008, under a lease agreement, the aircraft was chartered by the United Nations for its MONUSCO mission in Congo.

Accident

Flight
Flight 834 was a domestic passenger flight from Orientale provincial capital of Kisangani to the nation's capital of Kinshasa with the flag carrier of Georgia, Georgian Airways, as the operator of the flight. The flight was carried out with a Bombardier CRJ100ER, which was chartered by the United Nations for its missions in Congo following the outbreak of conflicts in the area. The flight had been operated by Georgian Airways since 2008. As it was chartered by United Nations, the flight was given the callsign "UNO".

UN flights are frequent in Congo, more than hundreds a week, as they are one of the best available means of transportation in the country; the flying route is one of the most used in the country. Flights operated by United Nations are frequently used to transport journalists and staffs of various non-governmental organizations.

On 4 April 2011, the aircraft was assigned to carry out a flight from Kisangani to Kinshasa. In Kisangani, a total of 29 passengers boarded the aircraft. There were 4 crew members on board, consisted of Captain Alexei Hovhanesyan, First Officer Suliko Tsutskiridze, a flight attendant and a ground engineer. The aircraft took off from Kisangani at 12:18 p.m local time with an estimated time of arrival at 13:55 p.m. The weather briefing for Kinshasa didn't indicate any significant development for severe weather for the next 2 hours.

Approach
Following their clearance, they realized that severe weather condition had formed around Kinshasa. Captain Hovhanesyan stated that the aircraft would have to go around the weather system to avoid it. His co-pilot, First Officer Tsutskiridze, decided to observe the developing weather condition.

Tsutkiridze was shocked to see the size of the storm, even could be heard once when he said that the entire ground surface was covered by "magenta". The discovery angered both pilots as the weather would complicate their landing attempt. During their conversation on the possible attempts to avoid the weather, personnel in Kinshasa asked the crew to report back on their position. The controller then cleared Flight 834 to conduct a straight-in approach to the localizer of Runway 24 of Kinshasa's N'djili Airport.

Captain Ognesyan, still angry with the weather condition in the area, asked his co-pilot to request the latest weather information in Kinshaha. The crew later discussed on the possible ways to approach the airport. Meanwhile, the airspeed continued to increase, nearly reaching . First Officer Tsutskiridze later said that he had seen the runway on one o'clock position. The crew reported back to the tower and the controller wished the crew for a good landing.

Accident 
The autopilot was turned off and the aircraft turned towards the runway. The crew configured the aircraft for landing and the passengers and other crews in the cabin were asked to prepare themselves. Approximately  from the airport, the crew successfully aligned the aircraft with the runway. The aircraft, however, came in at a speed that was above the normal amount, causing the overspeed warning to sound. While the crew was trying to reduce the airspeed, a squall line from the northeast arrived at Kinshasa. Heavy rain began to strike the aircraft. The aircraft continued to descent, passing over the airport's minimum descent altitude. First Officer Tsutkiridze stated that he could not see the runway anymore and suggested Captain Hovhanesyan to go-around, in which he agreed. 

The aircraft's nose was pitched up and its altitude began to increase. During the climb, the rain suddenly intensified as the aircraft was struck by a microburst. The wind shear warning blared inside the cockpit and the nose started to pitch downwards at an angle of 7 degree in a matter of seconds. Captain Hovhanesyan ordered First Officer Tsutkiridze to retract the flaps, however the aircraft continued to lose its altitude. Before the crew managed to conduct any recovery actions, their altitude was already too low.

The undercarriage immediately separated and the aircraft skidded across the ground before it finally flipped over. During the process, various parts of the aircraft began to shear off, including the tail.

A total of nine people were extricated alive from the wreckage. However, several survivors were pronounced dead on arrival and the others succumbed to their injuries. The sole survivor was 32-year-old Francis Mwamba, a Congolese journalist. He was seriously injured with a reported spinal fracture. Due to the severity of his injuries, he was flown to South Africa for further treatment.

Passengers and crews

Majority of those on board Flight 834 were staffs from the United Nations. The aircraft manifest listed 20 UN workers. The passengers included UN peacekeepers and officials, humanitarian workers and electoral assistants. The official UN news bulletin reported that 14 of the passengers were members of MONUSCO. Others were from various UN entities, such as the United Nations Development Programme (UNDP), UN Office for the Coordination of Humanitarian Affairs (OCHA), World Food Programme (WFP), and United Nations Office for Project Services (UNOPS). Five non-UN passengers were staff from non-governmental organizations in the Democratic Republic of the Congo or from other international organizations. UN reported that the non-UN passengers of Flight 834 were staffs from the DRC government, Congolese electoral commission, International Criminal Court, International Rescue Committee and Pacific Architects and Engineers.

Officials confirmed that the passengers were from 14 nationalities, including Congolese, South Africans, Bangladeshi,  Belgians, Ivorians, Malians, Ghanaian, Beninese, Burkinabe, Haitian, Kenyan, Mauritanian, Santomean and Senegalese.

Among the passengers was Mendes Masudi, an official adviser to the Foreign Minister of the DRC.

All of the crew members were Georgian citizens. The captain was reportedly a Georgian-Armenian. The captain and pilot in command was 27-year-old Alexey Hovhanesyan, who had 2,811 flight hours, including 1,622 hours on the CRJ100, (217 hours as captain and 1,405 as a first officer). He had just been promoted as a captain of the CRJ100 approximately 3 months before the accident. The first officer was 22-year-old Suliko Tsutskiridze, who was far less experienced than Captain Hovhaesyan, having logged only 495 flight hours with 344 of them on the CRJ100. The other crew members were identified as cabin crew Guram Kepuladze and ground engineer Albert Manukov.

Response
UN mission in Congo immediately established a task force to investigate the accident. Counsellors were provided and a hotline was established for the relatives of the victims. Then-head of MONUSCO, Roger Meece, visited the crash site in N'djili Airport along with other senior UN officials from MONUSCO. He expressed his shock for the extent of damage of the crash.

The UN Security Council, United Kingdom and the United States have offered their condolences for the accident. UN Secretary-general Ban Ki-Moon also issued a letter containing his sorrow of the crash and the other recent deadly incidents involving UN staff in Afghanistan, Ivory Coast and Haiti. In response to the crash, a wreath-laying ceremony will be held in New York's UN headquarters. Flags of the UN will be flown at half-mast in every UN offices around the world.

Investigation

Severe weather
The METAR in force at the time showed thunder showers and rain. According to a United Nations official, the aircraft "landed heavily, broke into two and caught fire". An eyewitness suggested windshear as a cause. The Under-Secretary-General for Peacekeeping Operations Alain Le Roy indicated that the poor weather was a key element in the cause of the crash.

Radar visuals on the weather in Kinshasa confirmed the presence of inclement condition in the area at the time of the crash. The depicted squall line was described as severe and fast-moving with very low cloud base. A significant increase in wind speed was also noted. The weather system deepened and eventually grew in size. This was also confirmed by the cockpit recording in which First Officer Tsutkiridze expressed his shock in response to the large coverage of the weather system. Imageries from the area showed the colour "magenta", which indicated possible strong thunderstorm activity.

Kinshasa's N'djili Airport was not provided with a weather radar and thus radar controller couldn't predict or relay information on the rapidly unfolding severe weather phenomenon to the crew of Flight 834. Despite this, the ATC had warned the crew on the prevailing weather condition in the airport with "Thunderstorm over the station", though the observance of squall line was not reported. However, the transmission was ignored by the crew due to, as per the investigation, the ATC personnel's slight accent.

Due to the size of the storm, the crew had to go around it. As a result, the crew weren't able to intercept the airport's localizer and to maintain their aircraft within the localizer path. They eventually managed to intercept the localizer at a distance of 2 nautical miles from the airport. Data from the FDR corroborated this finding as vertical G fluctuations and yaw damper movements were recorded on the device.

Decision to land
The onboard cockpit radar and the updated weather condition from the ATC had provided sufficient information to the crew regarding the weather condition at their destination airport. In respect to the appropriate procedure, the presence of severe weather in the area around Kinshasa should have prevented the crew from attempting a landing at the airport. The crew of Flight 834 however decided to continue their approach to Kinshasa. There had been doubts cast by the crew on the weather depiction on their radar, but even when they realized that the weather had indeed deteriorated throughout Kinshasa, they kept hoping that the weather would improve. This was caused by the imagery on their radar, in which the air mass was seen moving away from the airport.

The crew, believing that the airport would later be cleared of clouds, decided to continue their approach to Kinshasa. Their intention to land later became firmer as First Officer Tsutkiridze successfully obtained visual contact with the runway, which was on the right side of the aircraft. He then asked Captain Hovhanesyan to turn the aircraft to the right, but the Captain didn't make such input as he had not sighted the runway. The first officer then tried to convince the captain by pointing the direction of the runway and adding that "there was nothing there" (no significant weather phenomenon compared to the other area) and thus it was safer for them to fly there. Captain Hovhanesyan later saw the runway as well and prepared the aircraft for landing.

Their decision to land at Kinshasa, despite the adverse weather condition and their high airspeed, was described as inappropriate. According to the investigation, the crew might have had faced a "situation overload", which eventually decreased their ability to make decision correctly.

Procedural deviations
Other than the inappropriate decision that had been made by the crew, investigators also noted multiple procedural deviations during the entirety of the flight. Among those deviations were crew commencing descent below their respective flight level of 10,000ft at a speed above normal, configuring aircraft for a landing attempt at an altitude below the minimum descent altitude, no landing checklist callout, no reporting short on final as requested by ATC, continuing approach below minimum descent altitude during adverse weather condition, non-adherence to weather avoidance procedure and numerous other procedural deviations.

The crew had flown in the DRC for an extended period of time without any kind of supervision from Georgian Airways, MONUSCO, Georgian and DRC civil aviation administration on their flight conduct. Due to this lack of supervision, the crew believed that their deviations from flight manual wouldn't be discovered by their supervisors. While Georgian Airways had adopted Flight Operations Quality Assurance (FOQA) program, the airline had not followed said policy for the CRJ100 fleet. This lack of management supervision enabled the crew to deviate from the approved procedures.

Conduct of go-around
As the crew decided to go around, the thrust was not increased to the supposed level. The nose attitude was not in a sufficient upwards position for a recovery as it was only put at 8 degree and the aircraft's landing gear was not retracted. Due to the low altitude of the aircraft, according to investigators the crew would've needed a much more higher setting of the thrust lever (at fully forward position) and the landing gear should've been retracted for better aerodynamics. The nose pitch should have been raised to 10 degree. As such, the crew would've had better chances to recover from the microburst, albeit small.

The analysis from the recordings raised question on the possibility of the pilots not engaging the take-off go-around (TOGA) button during the go-around phase. This was due to the insufficient pitch attitude of the aircraft during the phase, which was put at an angle of 8 degree rather than 10 degree. The investigation noted that Captain Hovhanesyan, who was the pilot flying, had undergone a simulator training only once for his upgrade to the CRJ100, which was deemed as inadequate. He had recently been promoted as a captain for the CRJ100 on December 2010. Prior to the captain's upgrade to CRJ100, he had been flying as a first officer in a Boeing 737 for several years. The location of the TOGA button for the Boeing 737 was very different than that of the CRJ100. On the Boeing 737, the button is located forward, adjacent to the thrust lever. To engage the TOGA button, the crew should push the button with the index finger. On the CRJ100, the button is located on the side of the throttle lever and thus the crew should push it with the thumb sideways towards the lever. Due to lack of training, the captain possibly didn't push the TOGA button by his thumb due to his habit with the previous aircraft type.

By pressing the TOGA button, a command bar for the 10 degree reference indication would have appeared on the aircraft's flight director and pilots would've been able to notice it. Due to the non-activation of the TOGA button, the reference 10 degree didn't appear and thus the pitch attitude was not sufficiently raised to 10 degree. On the CRJ100, the command bar would've also appeared during the activation of the windshear warning. However, due to the low altitude and the strong force of the microburst, there were barely any time left for the crew to conduct it.

Oversight failure
The lack of simulator training that the captain received from Georgian Airways was attributed to the failure of the training program and oversight from Georgian Civil Aviation Administration (CAA). The syllabus from Georgian Airways had only required promoted pilots to undergo simulator training for one time before their respective line-oriented flight training. This was peculiar as, according to the investigation, such syllabus was not applied by other countries around the world. For recently promoted captain, the norm in many airlines is to conduct 8 to 10 simulator trainings, particularly for the CRJ fleet.

As a regulatory body for civil aviation in Georgia, the Georgian CAA should've reviewed the training program of Georgian Airways. The investigation stated that there were definite lapses on the oversight function of the Georgian CAA as Georgian Airways was allowed to apply such training syllabus. Georgian CAA, however, insisted that such syllabus was actually in conformance with ICAO standards and as such stated that it could not be included as one of the contributing factors to the crash. Although, they admitted that more training in areas regarding severe weather condition and "inadequate meteorological capabilities" are needed.

Other deficiencies 
Kinshasa's ATC personnel who was on duty at the time of the crash was also noted for deficiencies from their part. The ATC kept referring the latest weather update as "NOSIG". The term NOSIG was an abbreviation from "no significant", implying that no significant weather change was observed on the radar for the next 30 minutes. During the accident flight, the weather rapidly deteriorated in mere minutes but the ATC personnel kept relaying the term NOSIG to the crew. The rapidly changing weather condition eventually caused the visibility on the airport to deteriorate. As the visibility dropped to below the minimum of 2,400 meters, the ATC personnel should've closed the airport. Had the airport been closed then Flight 834 wouldn't have continued their approach to Kinshasa.

The team from Georgian CAA added that there were several other deficiencies from the ATC. According to the findings that had been gathered by the team, the crew had repeatedly tried to contact the ATC for the updated weather situation, however the ATC didn't respond until a few minutes after the transmission. When contact was established between the ATC and the crew, the weather information was still not available. The updated weather report was eventually received by the crew, approximately at one second before the crash. The ATC should've received the alert weather analysis from meteorological services and immediately contacted the crew on the weather condition and also advised the crew on possible diversion. All of these actions were not performed on the day of the accident.

Final report
An investigation from the Permanent Office of Investigations of Aviation Accidents/Incidents of the DRC Ministry of Transport and Channels of Communication listed the probable cause of the accident as follow:

A total of 13 recommendations were issued by the investigation team. Among the recommendations, the Congolese Ministry of Transport was asked to provide appropriate equipment for meteorological services in the DRC to provide better services. The DRC Civil Aviation Administration was ordered to immediately implement effective oversight on all airliners in the country and Georgian Airways was asked to revise their training program.

Differing view from Georgian counterpart
Despite of the findings that had been listed by the Congolese investigators, the Georgian CAA disputed several of the findings and asked clarifications on the content of the report. For instance, several statements were regarded as "devoid of objective analysis" pertinent to the situation and findings from Georgian CAA were included but not explained thoroughly, including the ATC's contributing factor to the crash.

The go-around phase was particularly noted by the CAA. According to the report, the crew didn't carry out the approach of the flight in accordance with the approved procedure. The CAA, however, stated that such statement was misleading as it didn't fully reflect the analysis of the crew's action during the flight. As inclement weather condition was prevailing in Kinshasa at the time, the flight operation manual actually recommended the crew to maintain higher airspeed than normal. Due to the crew's decision to avoid the weather system in the area, the crew were forced to delay configuring their aircraft.

The thrust setting that was applied by the crew at the time of the crash was just 1.8% lower than the recommended 92% thrust setting for a go-around procedure. This deviation was described as "insignificant", and, as the aircraft was struck by turbulence at the time, such precise setting of 92% thrust was deemed to be highly unlikely. Discussion with Bombardier also revealed that, even though the thrust was lower than the recommended thrust setting and the extended position of the landing gear, the aircraft was still able to perform a successful go-around. The Congolese investigation team, however, assumed that higher thrust setting would have improved the pilots' chances of avoiding the accident. This was seen as irrelevant by the Georgian counterpart.

The extended position of the landing gear and the non-activation of the TOGA button was also disputed by CAA. According to the CAA, the landing gear was still in extended position because the crew had not obtained the stabilized positive climb rate, which was technically in conformance with the approved flight manual. In light of the TOGA button finding, the CAA stated that the recorded behaviour on the aircraft showed more evidence that the TOGA button had actually been activated by the crew.

The Georgian CAA insisted that the accident was mainly caused by the severe weather condition in the area, the crew's decision to continue their flight despite the prevailing bad weather and the ATC's failure to inform the crew on the deteriorating weather condition in Kinshasa.

See also
 List of accidents and incidents involving airliners by location
 Bhoja Air Flight 213
 Si Fly Flight 3275
 1961 Ndola United Nations DC-6 crash

Notes

References

External links

 "RAPPORT FINAL D’ENQUETE TECHNIQUE SUR L’ACCIDENT DE L’AVION CRJ-100, IMMATRICULE 4L-GAE" (Archive) - Bureau Permanent d'Enquêtes d'Accidents et Incidents d'Aviation, Ministry of Transport and Channels of Communication 

Aviation accidents and incidents in 2011
2011 in the Democratic Republic of the Congo
2011 in Georgia (country)
Aviation accidents and incidents in the Democratic Republic of the Congo
United Nations operations in the Democratic Republic of the Congo
Airliner accidents and incidents caused by microbursts
Accidents and incidents involving the Bombardier CRJ200
April 2011 events in Africa
2011 disasters in the Democratic  Republic of the Congo